The Congress of Quintana Roo is the legislature of Quintana Roo, a state of Mexico. The Congress is unicameral.

See also
List of Mexican state congresses

External links
Official website

Government of Quintana Roo
Quintana Roo
Quintana Roo